Louis-Alexandre de Bourbon may refer to:

 Louis Alexandre de Bourbon, Count of Toulouse (1678–1737), illegitimate son of Louis XIV of France
 Louis Alexandre de Bourbon, Prince of Lamballe (1747–1768), grandson of the above